The Saudi riyal is the currency of  Saudi Arabia. It is abbreviated as
 or SAR (Saudi Arabian Riyal). It is subdivided into 100 halalas. The currency is pegged to the US dollar at a constant rate of exchange.

History

The riyal has been the currency of Saudi Arabia since the country came into being and was the currency of Hejaz before Saudi Arabia was created, one of the primary currencies in the Mediterranean region during the Ottoman era. The Hejaz riyal was based on but not equivalent to the Ottoman 20 kuruş coin and was consequently divided into 20 qirsh. However, although the Hejaz riyal was the same weight as the Ottoman 20 kuruş, it was minted in .917 fineness, compared to .830 fineness for the Ottoman coin. Thus, because the first Saudi riyal had the same specifications as the Hejaz riyal and circulated alongside Ottoman coins, it came to be worth 22 Ottoman kuruş and was consequently subdivided into 22 ghirsh when coins denominated in qirsh were issued from 1925. The system remained even though the riyal was subsequently debased to a coin equivalent, in silver content, to the Indian rupee in 1935.

In 1960, the system was changed to 20 qirsh to a riyal, which was followed in 1963 by the introduction of the halala, one hundredth of a riyal. Some Saudi coins still bear denominations in qirsh, but it is no longer commonly used.

Historical exchange rates

Coins

In 1935, the first coins were issued in the name of Saudi Arabia. These were silver ,  and 1 riyal coins which were nearly 50% lighter than the previous issue. Cupro-nickel ,  and 1 qirsh were also issued from 1937. In 1946 (AH 1365), many of the cupro-nickel coins were countermarked with the Arabic numerals 65 in what Krause and Mishler describe as "a move to break money changers' monopoly on small coins". Cupro-nickel 2 and 4 qirsh were introduced in 1957.

In 1963, the halala was introduced, and bronze 1 halala coins were issued. That was the only year they were struck. Cupro-nickel 5, 10, 25 and 50 halala followed in 1972, inscribed with their denomination in ghirsh or riyal (1, 2 qirsh,  riyal). In 1976, cupro-nickel 1 riyal coins were introduced, which are also inscribed with the denomination 100 halala. Bimetallic 1 riyal coins, also marked 100 halala, were issued in 1999.

A new series of 1, 5, 10, 25, and 50 halalas and bimetallic 1 and 2 riyal coins was issued in 2016.

Banknotes 

In 1953, the Saudi Arabian Monetary Agency (SAMA) began issuing Hajj Pilgrim Receipts for 10 riyals, with 1 and 5 riyals following in 1954 and 1956, respectively. These resembled banknotes and were initially intended for use by pilgrims who exchanged foreign currency for them. However, they became widely accepted in Saudi Arabia and largely replaced silver riyal coins in major financial transactions. Consequently, the Monetary Agency began issuing regular banknotes for 1, 5, 10, 50 and 100 riyals on 15 June 1961. The Pilgrim Receipts were withdrawn on 1 February 1965.

500 Riyal notes were introduced in 1983. 20 and 200 riyal banknotes were issued in 2000 to commemorate the centenary of the founding of what became the Kingdom of Saudi Arabia. The 5th series of banknotes bearing the face of King Abdullah were issued in 2007. The 6th series of banknotes bearing the face of King Salman bin Abdulaziz Al Saud were issued on 14/3/1438H (13/12/2016).

Series 5

On May 20, 2007, "the Saudi Arabian Monetary Agency, pursuant to article (4) of the Saudi Currency Law, issued under the Royal Decree No. (6) and dated 1/7/1379H." announced the fifth domination of the Saudi riyal that features King Abdullah's picture on all notes except the 500 riyals, which features King Abdulaziz. The 100 and 50 riyal notes were released on May 21, 2007. The 10 and 5 riyal notes followed in June 2007, then the 500 riyal followed in September 2007, and finally the 1 riyal note completed the series in December 2007. It is expected by the SAMA that the fourth (current) series will take approximately two years to phase out, although a complete removal of the current series require more than two years since the fourth series has been in circulation for well over 25 years. The fourth series which feature King Fahd's picture will remain legal tender under the Saudi Arabian monetary law. The new series have the latest and most advanced security system to prevent from counterfeiting and other similar activities.

Series 6 (2016 series)
The newly renamed Saudi Arabian Monetary Authority unveiled a new family of banknotes with the portrait of King Salman on banknotes from 5 to 100 riyals, with a portrait of King Abdulaziz Al Saud on the 500 riyals banknote. On the 4 October 2020, the Saudi Arabian Monetary Authority announced the first polymer note to be used in Saudi Arabia, being the 5 riyals note, to replace the current paper banknote, without any announcement on the other banknotes. The banknote was said to feature more environmentally friendly materials and additional security features, in addition to a much longer lifespan.

Fixed exchange rate
In June 1986, the riyal was officially pegged to the IMF's special drawing rights (SDRs). In practice, it is fixed at 1 U.S. dollar = 3.75 riyals, which translates to approximately 1 riyal = 0.266667 dollar. This rate was made official on January 1, 2003.

The riyal briefly rose to a 20-year high after the US Federal Reserve cut interest rates on September 18, 2007, and the SAMA chose not to follow suit, partially due to concerns about the inflationary effects low interest rates and a lower value for the riyal. The riyal returned to its peg against the U.S. dollar in early December 2007.

Proposed monetary union

Saudi Arabia is a member of the Cooperation Council for the Arab States of the Gulf, which planned a monetary union with a single currency by 2010. However, all GCC countries operate with their own currency so far.

See also
 Banks in Saudi Arabia
 Economy of Saudi Arabia

References

External links
 Saudi banknotes From the first edition to the special edition.
 http://www.islamicbanknotes.com/

Currencies of Saudi Arabia
Fixed exchange rate